Nerissa may refer to:
 Nerissa (given name), a feminine given name
 Nerissa, a character in Shakespeare's play The Merchant of Venice
 Mira (wasp), a wasp genus in the subfamily Encyrtinae
 Cepora nerissa, the common gull, a butterfly in the family Pieridae
 HMS Nerissa
 SS Nerissa, a passenger and cargo steamer which was torpedoed and sunk on 30 April 1941
 Narissa, a villain character in the comic book series W.I.T.C.H and the television adaptation of the same name